Mia Dearden is a DC Comics superheroine, the second character to take the mantle of Green Arrow's sidekick Speedy.  Created by writer Kevin Smith and artist Phil Hester, she first appeared in Green Arrow (vol. 3) #2 (May 2001). She is one of the few HIV-positive characters in comic books. In The New 52, a mysterious man is currently searching for Mia.

Mia Dearden appeared in Smallville, portrayed by Elise Gatien. A loose adaptation, Thea Queen, appeared on the Arrowverse television series Arrow, portrayed by Willa Holland.

Fictional character biography
Mia Dearden is a teenage runaway who was abused by her father. Unable to survive on her own, she fell in love with a man who offered her shelter and food in exchange for exploiting her in his child prostitution ring. Mia was rescued from one of her clients, a depraved local politician, by the costumed hero Green Arrow, who had just returned from the dead and to Star City. Sent by the Green Arrow to see Oliver Queen (his real identity) for help, Mia saw through Queen's disguise and became his new ward; in time, he sees her as a daughter. Mia continued to work with Oliver, who was busy trying to reconstruct his own life, and after coming upon her crossbow, Ollie began to train her as an archer. In addition, she trains with Oliver's son Connor Hawke in martial arts and forges a close friendship with him. Mia continually petitioned Green Arrow to allow her to serve as his sidekick, but Oliver demurred, not wanting to put another teenager at risk.

Mia appeared in Green Arrow as a supporting character until 2004, when writer Judd Winick revealed that she was HIV-positive, a legacy of her exploitation. With this knowledge, Mia redoubled her efforts to convince Green Arrow to let her become the new Speedy, and the Green Arrow finally relented. Mia takes up the mantle of Speedy, and subsequently Oliver decided that she would do well to join the Teen Titans. In order to earn her spot on the team, Cyborg had the new Speedy face off against Robin. While Robin beat Speedy, Mia proved herself to be a very skilled fighter and worthy Titan. Shortly after her first official mission with the Titans, she revealed to the team that she was HIV-positive. They accepted her without question or fear.

The first Speedy, Arsenal (Roy Harper), gave Mia a set of his old arrows, including a mysterious blue arrow labeled: "Only use in an emergency". Not even Roy knew its power. Mia was tempted to use the arrow in her first mission against Dr. Light; against a possessed Superboy, Indigo, Lex Luthor, and Brainiac; and again when they faced off against the demon servants of Brother Blood. When she finally used the arrow, it turned out to be a Phantom Zone arrow, stolen from Superman's Fortress of Solitude by Roy when he was Speedy. Mia used the arrow to attempt to trap Superboy-Prime; however, he was able to escape almost immediately, apparently through his super-strength.

After the events of Infinite Crisis, Mia recuperated from injuries on an island with Green Arrow and Connor, returning approximately a year later.  In her time on the island, Mia trained in new styles of fighting and healing, and on working as a team with Green Arrow.

Jason Todd, the former partner of Batman, kidnaps Dearden. Jason believed he and Speedy shared similarities, though he kidnapped her to retaliate against Batman's interference in his gun smuggling operation. By involving Green Arrow, he was trying to show Batman the price of enlisting others into their conflict. Jason took Speedy to Smith O'Neil High School, where the former Robin untied her so that they could fight. Jason commented on how alike they were, living on the streets and having to do bad things in order to survive. He was also aware of her past and situations with her family, as a prostitute, and her HIV status. Jason defeated Speedy, but allowed her to escape after telling her that neither Batman nor the Green Arrow would ever understand him, but that she would. Afterward, he blew up the school and left. Despite her vehement denial, Jason's words have apparently affected Mia on some level.

In the months since this event, things for Mia and the rest of her family have been in a constant state of upheaval. It all began when Green Arrow proposed to the Black Canary. After a ceremony in Happy Harbor that was then attacked by super-villains, it was revealed the Green Arrow never actually managed to marry Dinah. Instead, he was kidnapped and replaced with Everyman, who attempted to kill Dinah on her wedding night. Mia, Connor, and Dinah manage to save Ollie who was kidnapped by Granny Goodness and the Amazons, but immediately after Connor is nearly killed by a gunshot meant for Ollie. The attack leaves Connor in a vegetative state, after which he is kidnapped by the supposed League of Assassins. Mia, Dinah and Ollie scour the world with Batman and Plastic Man in search of their missing family member. During this time, the group meet and work with a young British vigilante nicknamed Dodger, to whom Mia becomes attracted to. Throughout the mission, Mia and Dodger work together, this partnership culminating in Dodger asking Mia out on a date.

After Connor's rescue, Mia moves to London to pursue a romance with Dodger, although she eventually returns from London, having broken up with Dodger since she found him 'snogging' the actress Emma Watson. She returns just in time to save Black Canary during a battle and to witness Ollie leaving. She returns in a costume of black with black arrows, differentiating her from the green costume that Ollie wears and the red that Roy sports as Red Arrow.

During the Blackest Night storyline, Mia briefly travels to Coast City with Connor in order to fight off the Black Lantern invasion. She and Connor rescue Dinah from Ollie, who had been transformed into a Black Lantern by Nekron. They return to Star City following the end of Blackest Night.

During the events of Justice League: Cry for Justice, Mia is babysitting Roy Harper's daughter Lian, but is called away when the Electrocutioner is sighted planting bombs created by Prometheus in Star City, which are intended to move Star City to an alternate universe. The bombs, however, do not teleport the city but instead begin destroying it. To Mia's horror, the bombs destroy their home and kill Lian. This leads directly to the storyline of Rise and Fall.

In the Rise and Fall storyline, Mia helps out Green Arrow after the Justice League attempts to capture him for killing Prometheus. While Green Arrow distracts the League, Mia kidnaps the Electrocutioner and brings him to their hideout beneath Star City. Though Mia begs Green Arrow for the chance to kill Electrocutioner, he convinces her that killing is not the answer, and takes Electrocutioner into custody. Following Electrocutioner's arrest, Mia attends Lian's funeral alongside a number of prominent heroes, including her former teammates from the Teen Titans. During the service, Mia is attacked by Roy, who angrily blames her for getting Lian killed. Though Ravager intervenes and eventually causes Roy to leave, Mia is left visibly shaken by his accusations.

Alongside Damian Wayne and a group of other ex-Titans, Mia aids the then-current team of Teen Titans during their battle against Superboy-Prime and the Legion of Doom. During the battle, she and Ravager work together to successfully take down Persuader.

The New 52
In September 2011, The New 52 rebooted DC's continuity. In this new timeline, the character is first mentioned in the Green Arrow storyline "Kingdom" when a mysterious individual tortures a man for information on the whereabouts of Mia Dearden, whom he somehow considers to be more of a threat to him than the Green Arrow. She is only shown in a picture. She says that her father, John King, is after her.

Powers and abilities
Mia possesses no superhuman powers and abilities but is an accomplished archer. Unlike Connor Hawke, who relies on simple wooden shafts, like Oliver, Mia employs trick arrows. In addition to a bow, Mia is also proficient in the use of a crossbow, much to Oliver's dismay. Although Mia is a skilled street fighter, Connor Hawke and Black Canary also taught her many forms of martial arts such as Krav Maga, Kenjustu  and self-defense prior to taking up the mantle of "Speedy". One year after Infinite Crisis, she expanded her training on an island with Connor and, like her mentor, is now an expert in sword combat.

Mia is HIV-positive and, as such, she takes antiretroviral drugs with all the attendant side effects. Due to her condition, she also has to be very careful when injured in combat.

In other media

Television 

 Mia Dearden appears in Smallville, portrayed by Elise Gatien. Similarly to the comics, this version is a brunette runaway who turned to prostitution before entering an underground boxing ring. In the episode "Crossfire", Oliver Queen finds Dearden and attempts to take her under his wing, but she betrays him to a criminal she owes money to. With Lois Lane's help, Queen rescues Dearden. In the episode "Disciple", Dearden is kidnapped by Vordigan before she is rescued by Queen and Clark Kent, during which she discovers the former's secret identity and becomes his protégée.
 Characters inspired by Mia Dearden appear in Arrow:
 A loose interpretation named Thea Dearden Queen (portrayed by Willa Holland) appears as the daughter of Malcolm Merlyn and half-sister of Oliver Queen. Throughout the series, she used "Mia" as an alias and eventually goes on to join Team Arrow as Speedy.
 A separate character named Mia Smoak (portrayed by Katherine McNamara) appears as Queen's future daughter from 2040 who takes on the mantle of the Green Arrow while helping Oliver avert a "Crisis".

Miscellaneous 
The Smallville incarnation of Mia Dearden appears in Smallville Season 11.

References

Sources 

Characters created by Kevin Smith
Characters created by Phil Hester
DC Comics sidekicks
Comics characters introduced in 2001
DC Comics female superheroes
DC Comics martial artists
DC Comics orphans
Fictional archers
Fictional characters from California
Fictional characters with HIV/AIDS
Fictional child prostitutes
Fictional detectives
Green Arrow characters
Superheroes who are adopted
Teenage superheroes
Vigilante characters in comics